The 2002 Copa Perú season, the promotion tournament of Peruvian football.

The tournament had five stages. The first four stages were played as mini-league round-robin tournaments, except for third stage in region IV, which was played as a knockout stage. The final stage featured two knockout rounds and a final four-team group stage to determine the two promoted teams.

This year twenty six teams qualified for the Etapa Regional (Regional Stage): these are the twenty six champions from each department (including two from Lima (the capital) - Perú was politically divided in twenty four Departments and one Constitutional Province.

All these teams were divided into eight groups by geographical proximity; then each winner qualified for the Etapa Nacional (National Stage). Those eight teams played, again by geographical proximity, home and away matches, in a knock-out tournament.  The winner of the final was promoted to the First Division.

Departmental Stage
The following list shows the teams that qualified for the Regional Stage.

Regional Stage
The following list shows the teams that qualified for the Regional Stage.

Region I
Region I included qualified teams from Amazonas, Lambayeque, Piura and Tumbes region.

Group A

Group B

Regional Final

Region II
Region II included qualified teams from Ancash, Cajamarca and La Libertad region.

Region III
Region III included qualified teams from Loreto, San Martín and Ucayali region.

Region IV
Region IV includes qualified teams from Callao, Ica and Lima region.

Tiebreaker

Region V
Region V included qualified teams from Huánuco, Junín and Pasco region.

Region VI
Region VI includes qualified teams from Apurímac, Ayacucho and Huancavelica region.

Region VII
Region VII included qualified teams from Cusco, Madre de Dios and Puno region.

Tiebreaker

Region VIII
Region VIII included qualified teams from Arequipa, Moquegua and Tacna region.

National Stage
The National Stage started in November. The winner of the National Stage was promoted to the First Division.

Tiebreaker

External links
 Copa Peru 2002

Copa Perú seasons
2002 domestic association football cups
2002 in Peruvian football